Even before the outbreak of the Al-Aqsa Intifada, various militant Palestinian (Palestinian resistance) groups built domestically-produced weapons for attacks against Israel. Most of the effort has been in the production of unguided artillery rockets, though Hamas has built its own versions of anti-tank missiles and rocket-propelled grenades (RPGs). Though usually smuggled across the Egyptian border into the Gaza Strip and to a lesser extent Jordanian border into the West Bank, various small arms are believed to be produced in the Palestinian territories.

On 14 August 2008 the Popular Resistance Committees showed off the Nasser-4 missile, an upgraded version of the existing Nasser-3.

Known equipment

Aircraft
 Ababeel1

Rockets

Multiple Rocket Launcher
 al Quds-3 MRL (Hamas & Palestinian Islamic Jihad Movement)

Short Range Artillery Rockets
 Qassam Type 1, 2, 3, & 4 (Hamas)
 al Quds Type 101 & 2 (Palestinian Islamic Jihad Movement)
 al Nasser-3 (Popular Resistance Committees)
 al Nasser-4 (Popular Resistance Committees)
 Saria-2 (Tanzim)
 Kafah (Fatah)
 Jenin-1 (Fatah)
 Arafat Type 1 & 2 (Al Aqsa Martyrs Brigade)
 Aqsa-3 (Al Aqsa Martyrs Brigade)
 Al-Samoud (Popular Front for the Liberation of Palestine)

Anti-Tank Missiles
 Yasin RPG (Hamas)
 al Bana RPG (Hamas developed, in use by other factions)  
 al Batar RPG (Hamas developed, in use by other factions)

Mortars 
 Sariya-1 240mm Mortar (Fatah & Popular Front for the Liberation of Palestine)

Small arms 
 Carlo (submachine gun)

References

Bibliography
 

Israeli–Palestinian conflict
Palestinian inventions